The mirwās or marwas, plural marāwīs is a small double-sided, high-pithced hand drum originally from the Middle East. It is a popular instrument in the Arab States of the Persian Gulf, used in sawt and fijiri music. It is also common in Kuwait and Yemen.

Hadhrami migrants from Yemen took the instrument to Muslim Southeast Asia (especially Indonesia, Malaysia and Brunei), where it is used in Zapin and Gambus musical genres. A similar drum of this area is the Gendang.

The Marwas drums used to accompany Gambus music in Lampung, Indonesia often consist of four sizes with two skins of a diameter between 12-20 centimetres. The skins are commonly made from goatskin and formerly black monkey skin and are laced with leather or plastic to a jackfruit-wood cylindrical body of around 8 to 10 centimetres in height.

See also
 Qanbus
 Zapin

References

 Double-skinned (double-headed) drums - Oman Centre for Traditional Music
 Traditional music in the Yemen - The British-Yemeni Society
 Charles Capwell, 'Contemporary Manifestations of Yemeni-Derived Song and Dance in Indonesia', Yearbook for Traditional Music, Vol. 27, (1995), pp. 76–89
 Marwas - Musical instruments of Malaysia

External links
 Youtube video - mirwas played

Hand drums
Arabic musical instruments
Kuwaiti music
Omani musical instruments
Yemeni musical instruments
Bruneian musical instruments
Indonesian musical instruments
Malaysian musical instruments
Bahraini musical instruments